Love and Saint Augustine (Der Liebesbegriff bei Augustin. Versuch einer philosophischen Interpretation; On the concept of love in the thought of Saint Augustine: Attempt at a philosophical interpretation) was the title of Hannah Arendt's 1929 doctoral thesis. An English translation including revisions by Arendt was not published until 1996.

Influenced by two of her teachers, Martin Heidegger and Karl Jaspers it deals with three concepts of love in the work of St Augustine, which would appear in her works over the rest of her life. Of these the phrase amor mundi (love of the world) is often associated with Arendt and both permeates her work and was an absorbing passion. 
Other themes that are a key to her later work include "Natality" as a key condition of human existence and its role in the development of the individual.

History 
Love and Saint Augustine was the title of Hannah Arendt's doctoral thesis from the University of Heidelberg in 1929. When it was first published in Berlin it attracted critical interest. Although an English translation had been prepared by E B Ashton in the early 1960s, Arendt did not want it published without revising it and adding new material. Although she prepared several manuscripts, she ultimately abandoned the task and it was not published in English until after her death, in 1996.

Structure 
In this work, she combines approaches of both Heidegger and Jaspers, her most influential teachers. Arendt's interpretation of love in the work of St. Augustine deals with three concepts, love as craving or desire (Amor qua appetitus), love in the relationship between man (creatura) and creator (Creator - Creatura), and neighborly love (Dilectio proximi), and is constructed in three sections dealing with each of these. Love as craving anticipates the future, while love for the Creator deals with the remembered past. Of the three, dilectio proximi  or caritas is perceived as the most fundamental, to which the first two are oriented, which she treats under vita socialis (social life). The second of the Great Commandments (or Golden Rule) "Thou shalt love thy neighbor as thyself" uniting and transcending the former. Augustine's influence (and Jaspers' views on his work)  persisted in Arendt's writings for the rest of her life.

Already in this work some of the leitmotifs of her canon were apparent. For instance, she introduced the concept of Natalität (Natality) as a key condition of human existence and its role in the development of the individual. She made clear, in her revisions to the English translation, through explicit reference, that it was "natality" that she was introducing, and would develop further in The Human Condition (1958). Although she did not specifically use the word Natalität in the original German version, she explained that the construct of natality was implied in her discussion of new beginnings and man's elation to the Creator as nova creatura. The centrality of the theme of birth and renewal is apparent in the constant reference to Augustinian thought, and specifically the innovative nature of birth, from this, her first work, to her last, The Life of the Mind.

Love is another connecting theme. In addition to the Augustinian loves expostulated in her dissertation, the phrase amor mundi (love of the world) is one often associated with Arendt and both permeates her work and was an absorbing passion from her dissertation to The Life of the Mind (1978). She took the phrase from Augustine's homily on the first epistle of St John, "If love of the world dwell in us". Amor mundi was her original title for The Human Condition (1958), the subtitle of Elisabeth Young-Bruehl's biography (1982), the title of a collection of writing on faith in her work and the newsletter of the Hannah Arendt Center at Bard College.

Notes

References

Bibliography 

 , reprinted as
  Full text on Internet Archive
  Also available in English as:
  Full text on Internet Archive
 
  (see also The Human Condition)
 
 , available in Latin as
 
 , in 
 
 
 
 
 , in 
 
 
 
 
 
 
 , in 
  (updated by way of a second preface, pagination unchanged)

Bibliographic notes 

1929 non-fiction books
Books by Hannah Arendt
Augustine studies
Theses